Myrtle Creek is a city in Douglas County, Oregon, United States. The population was 3,439 at the 2010 census.

History
Myrtle Creek was named for the groves of Oregon myrtle (also known as California laurel), growing nearby. A Myrtle Creek post office was established in 1854 with Lazarus Wright as postmaster. In 1862, Wright sold the land for a town site to John Hall, who laid out Myrtle Creek in 1865.

The city has two covered bridges. The first, Neal Lane Bridge, carries Neal Lane Road over South Myrtle Creek on the southeastern outskirts of the city. It was built in 1939.
 
In 1990, the City of Myrtle Creek acquired timbers from the former Horse Creek Bridge in Lane County and used them to build another covered bridge over Myrtle Creek. The bridge connects a parking area to the city's Mill Site Park.

Geography
Myrtle Creek lies along Interstate 5 south of Roseburg and slightly north of Tri City and Canyonville in southern Douglas County. Two streams, North Myrtle Creek and South Myrtle Creek, merge at the city to form Myrtle Creek, a short tributary of the South Umpqua River.

Climate
This region experiences warm (but not hot) and dry summers, with no average monthly temperatures above . According to the Köppen Climate Classification system, Myrtle Creek has a warm-summer Mediterranean climate, abbreviated "Csb" on climate maps.

Demographics

2010 census
As of the census of 2010, there were 3,439 people, 1,382 households, and 930 families living in the city. The racial makeup of the city was 90.7% White, 0.3% African American, 2.1% Native American, 0.8% Asian, 0.1% Pacific Islander, 1.2% from other races, and 4.9% from two or more races. Hispanic or Latino of any race were 4.3% of the population.

There were 1,382 households, of which 31.2% had children under the age of 18 living with them, 47.5% were married couples living together, 14.3% had a female householder with no husband present, 5.6% had a male householder with no wife present, and 32.7% were non-families. 26.4% of all households were made up of individuals, and 13.7% had someone living alone who was 65 years of age or older. The average household size was 2.46 and the average family size was 2.92.

The median age in the city was 40.5 years. 23.3% of residents were under the age of 18; 8.4% were between the ages of 18 and 24; 24.2% were from 25 to 44; 26.6% were from 45 to 64; and 17.7% were 65 years of age or older. The gender makeup of the city was 49.1% male and 50.9% female.

2000 census
As of the census of 2000, there were 3,419 people, 1,339 households, and 914 families living in the city. The population density was 1,952.5 people per square mile (754.3/km). There were 1,437 housing units at an average density of 820.6 per square mile (317.0/km). The racial makeup of the city was 93.45% White, 0.15% African American, 2.14% Native American, 0.88% Asian, 0.67% from other races, and 2.72% from two or more races. Hispanic or Latino of any race were 3.07% of the population.

There were 1,339 households, out of which 34.0% had children under the age of 18 living with them, 50.9% were married couples living together, 12.6% had a female householder with no husband present, and 31.7% were non-families. 26.0% of all households were made up of individuals, and 12.5% had someone living alone who was 65 years of age or older. The average household size was 2.55 and the average family size was 3.06.

In the city, the population was spread out, with 28.5% under the age of 18, 8.7% from 18 to 24, 25.7% from 25 to 44, 22.3% from 45 to 64, and 14.8% who were 65 years of age or older. The median age was 36 years. For every 100 females, there were 91.9 males. For every 100 females age 18 and over, there were 84.1 males.

The median income for a household in the city was $30,658, and the median income for a family was $40,000. Males had a median income of $30,559 versus $22,102 for females. The per capita income for the city was $14,813. About 14.4% of families and 17.4% of the population were below the poverty line, including 26.9% of those under age 18 and 13.5% of those age 65 or over.

Transportation
 Myrtle Creek Municipal Airport

See also
South Umpqua High School
Umpqua Research Company

References

External links

 Entry for Myrtle Creek in the Oregon Blue Book
 Myrtle Creek/Tri-City Area Chamber of Commerce

Cities in Oregon
Cities in Douglas County, Oregon
1893 establishments in Oregon
Populated places established in 1893